Åsa Ulrika Karlsson (née Burman; born 1973) is a Swedish politician, teacher and member of the Riksdag, the national legislature. A member of the Social Democratic Party, she has represented Västerbotten County since September 2018.

Karlsson is the daughter of factory worker Henry Burman and Ingrid Burman (née Söderström). She was educated in Skellefteå and has a teaching degree from Mid Sweden University. She has worked as a child minder and school teacher.

References

1973 births
Living people
Members of the Riksdag 2018–2022
Members of the Riksdag 2022–2026
Members of the Riksdag from the Social Democrats
Mid Sweden University alumni
People from Skellefteå Municipality
Swedish schoolteachers
Women members of the Riksdag
21st-century Swedish women politicians